UltraNoir is a Finnish synthpop / gothic rock / post-punk trio founded in 2004.

Starting as a pop group, UltraNoir is influenced  by shoegaze and post-rock as well as early eighties post-punk acts such as Joy Division, The Cure along with the Sisters Of Mercy and Bauhaus. These elements blended with political (anarchist) lyrics.  UltraNoir's themes considered bleak visions of fascism, globalisation, social classes, sexism and existential complications of western moral codes over dreamy melody streams and laconic vocals.

Their first single "Reach Me, Helen Keller" (2006) reached chart position No. 4 in Finland.

After former guitarist Jan left the group to form Heroin and Your Veins, the remaining members Anton, Utu and Jesi continued to tour without a guitarist. Eventually Jesi too parted ways with the band leaving Anton and Utu to perform as a duo and reducing the sounds to a bleak wall of nihilism. In 2009 Niki Vaan from Cherry Stained and Nokia Missio joined their ranks, first as a tour guitarist and then as a recognized member of the band. 

In early 2011, Janne Perttula rejoined UltraNoir, leading the group working on its second album UltraNoia that was released in September 2013.

Discography 
 UltraNoir/Romantic Vision 7" split "Godspeed For Good" / "Worldwide Panic" (2004)
 Compilation New Dark Age vol.3 (Strobelight, 2005)
 CDs Reach Me, Helen Keller (Quiet Life, 2006)
 Album Suffer No Fiction (Quiet Life, 2006)
 Compilation Independent Rock (Bianca-Pop, 2007)
 Compilation  Smoke and spotlight vol. 5  (Inside Agitator, 2011)
 Album Ultranoia (2013)

Members

Current
 Anton Vaan (vox, prog) 
 Utu Vaan (synth)
 Jesi Vaan (bass,synth)

Previous
 Niki Vaan (guitar)
 Janne Perttula (guitar, prog.)

References

External links
 UltraNoir website

Dance-punk musical groups